The qualifying groups for the 2006 UEFA European Under-21 Championship, where possible, matched the 7- and 6-team World Cup 2006 qualifying groups of the senior European teams.  The exceptions were where Andorra, Faroe Islands, Liechtenstein, and Northern Ireland were involved; none of whom entered an under-21 team.   Germany, whose seniors did not need to qualify for the World Cup (as they will be hosts) were added to one of the 5-team groups created by the absence of the aforementioned nations.

Europe's 48 national under-21 teams entering were divided into eight groups (six groups of 6 + one group of 5 + one group of 7).  The eight group winners played off against the eight group runners-up on a two-legged home-and-away basis to decide the eight qualifying teams.

Qualifying Groups

Draw
The allocation of teams into qualifying groups was based on that of 2006 FIFA World Cup qualification with several changes, reflecting the absence of some nations:
 Groups 2, 5, 7 and 8 featured the same nations
 Group 1 did not include Andorra
 Group 3 did not include Liechtenstein
 Group 4 did not include Faroe Islands
 Group 6 did not include Northern Ireland, but included Germany (who did not participate in World Cup qualification)
This was the last time when this grouping schema was applied for U21 qualifying groups.

Group 1

Group 2

Group 3

Group 4

Group 5

Group 6

Group 7

Group 8

Play-offs

Group winners played at home in the second leg.

|}

External links
 Results Archive at UEFA.com

 
Qualification
Qual
UEFA European Under-21 Championship qualification